Texas is a 1941 American Western film directed by George Marshall and starring William Holden, Glenn Ford and Claire Trevor. Texas was an early picture for both Holden (his seventh credited performance) and Ford (his ninth). The film was designed by Columbia as a follow-up, though not a sequel, to the previous year's Arizona, which also starred Holden.

Plot
Two Confederate veterans, broke and homeless, are making their way to Texas to start fresh. After comedic adventures getting into and out of trouble, just trying to make enough money to get to Texas, they witness a stagecoach robbery and manage to hold up the outlaws and take back the cash. At that point they have a difference of opinion; the "good" one Todd Ramsey (Glenn Ford) wants to give it back, the "bad" one Dan Thomas (William Holden) wants to keep it and keep going. Goodness wins out, and both are off the hook.

Todd takes a job with the biggest local rancher who has a beautiful and friendly daughter, "Mike" King (Claire Trevor). Dan stumbles into a different kind of job—with another rancher who specializes in rustling. They both have heads turned by the lovely lady and the battle of good and evil continues. The key to the action is the need to get the entire town/valley's cattle past all the rustlers up to the railroad at Abilene.

Dan is falsely accused of taking a shot at Todd. As he tries to escape the angry townsfolk, he shoots both the men behind the attempt on Todd's life, but he is shot and killed by the second one, Doc Thorpe, who is also the town's dentist. Todd appears at the door just after Doc Thorpe and Dan have shot each other. Todd closes the door to shield Mike's eyes from the sight of Dan's body. Ultimately, Todd and Mike go back to herding cattle together as they ride side by side while holding hands.

Cast
 William Holden as Dan Thomas
 Glenn Ford as Tod Ramsey
 Claire Trevor as 'Mike' King
 George Bancroft as Windy Miller
 Edgar Buchanan as Buford "Doc" Thorpe
 Don Beddoe as Sheriff
 Andrew Tombes as Tennessee
 Addison Richards as Matt Lashan
 Edmund MacDonald as Comstock,
 Joseph Crehan as Rancher Dusty King
 Willard Robertson as Rancher Wilson
 Pat Moriarity as Rancher Matthews (as Patrick Moriarity)
 Edmund Cobb as Rancher Blaire

See also
 List of American films of 1941

References

External links 
 
 
 
 

American black-and-white films
1941 Western (genre) films
1941 films
Films directed by George Marshall
Films produced by Samuel Bischoff
Films scored by Carmen Dragon
Films set in Texas
American Western (genre) films
Columbia Pictures films
1940s English-language films
1940s American films